Thomas Frederick Biddlestone (26 November 1906 – 1982) was an English professional football goalkeeper, best known for his time at Aston Villa. He signed for Villa from Walsall, and then played for Mansfield Town before retiring.

References
Biddlestone's Bio at Aston Villa Player Database

1906 births
1982 deaths
English footballers
Aston Villa F.C. players
Walsall F.C. players
Mansfield Town F.C. players
Association football goalkeepers